Jahanpanah City Forest is located in South Delhi. It is a densely forested park in Delhi spreading over 435 acres of land. The park is accessible from Greater Kailash II, Tughlakabad Extension, Batra Gate, Dhobi Ghat, Sheikh Sarai, Chirag Delhi, Masjid Moth DDA Flats and Balvantray Mehta Vidya Bhawan School.

References

Parks in Delhi
Tourist attractions in Delhi
Protected areas with year of establishment missing